Ajaya: Roll of the Dice is a 2013 Indian novel of mythological fiction  written by Anand Neelakantan. The first installment of the Ajaya series, it tells the story of the Kauravas. As opposed to the usual tale told from the point of view of the victors, this entire story is written from Duryodhana's point view.

Reception 
Hindustan Times writes, "Neelakantan got Ravana to steal Rama’s thunder as the hero of the Ramayana. He dismantled long-cherished beliefs of good and evil, questioning the idea of victory and defeat. Asura sold more than a million copies, but Neelakantan is far from finished. Now, Ajaya: Roll Of The Dice, takes on the Mahabharata, this time focusing on the ‘unconquerable’ Kauravas." The Indian Nerve rated it 3.5 out of 5 stating "The simple and gripping writing style coupled with fast-paced story throughout the book is sure to make you enjoy the book."

References

Further reading
Gala, Heta. Book Review | Roll Of The Dice. tell-a-tale.com.
Rammohan, T. “India will bleed from a thousand cuts” Book Review: Ajaya Book 1-Roll of the dice. ramasya.com. 
Yashwant. Ajaya: Roll of the Dice – Anand Neelakantan | Book Review (Epic of the Kaurava Clan # 1). idlebrains.org.

External links
Website 
Preview at Google Books

Hindu mythology in popular culture
Indian English-language novels
Novels set in India
2013 Indian novels
Novels based on the Mahabharata